The Ferals was an Australian children's comedy television series which screened on the ABC from 1994 to 1995. It was created by Wendy Gray and Claire Henderson and featured a mixture of people and animal puppets known as the "Ferals". It was lauded for its irreverent humour and distinctive characters, some of which featured on other ABC programming. Garth Frost was responsible for the puppet design. In the UK, the show aired on satellite television via Nickelodeon UK.

Plot
The Ferals are an eclectic group of animals that live together in a backyard shed. There is a rat called Rattus, a feral cat called Modigliana, a rabbit called Mixy, and a feral dog called Derryn. The humans are two university students, and their landlord, who clash with each other and the Ferals.

They include the uptight, neurotic landlord Joe King who is determined to remove the ferals from his garden; the affable science student Leonard, and medical student Roberta 'Robbie', who attempt to shield the ferals from eviction, but are sometimes exasperated with their antics.

There were also the 'Bozos From The Bush' as Modigliana liked to call them, Keith, a koala and Kylie, a kangaroo. These two characters often clashed with the Ferals, thinking they were above them due to their status as native Australian animals.

They were also quite nasal and whiney in their characteristics. Other characters included White Ants (Tina Bursill, Robert Hughes), Rock Wrangler (Tina Matthews) and Fat Cat (Taylor Owynns)

Characters

Puppets
Rattus P. Rattus (He's the leader of the bunch) Puppeteer - David Collins: The leather-jacket wearing leader of the ferals, Rattus is a black rat with a mischievous sense of humour and a love of foul odours. He enjoys taunting the cat Modigliana ("fur ball"), but is often thumped in return. He is obsessed with procuring a car of his own, often concocting several outlandish schemes to acquire one and jumping at any opportunity that will provide even the slightest chance of getting one. Rattus rattus is the scientific name for the common black rat.
Modigliana Wydebottom (She's fluffy, but she's tough) Puppeteer - Mal Heap: A preening cat, Modigliana is also self-confident, tough and forceful, frequently clashing with Rattus as the only other particularly intelligent animal. She has parallels with the Muppets character Miss Piggy, albeit with more manginess and violence.
Derryn (A Dopey Dog) Puppeteer - Terry Ryan: Derryn is a dog who is not the brightest of the bunch and has a habit of forgetting where he buried his bone, but does occasionally show flashes of brilliance, such as when he won a contest to win money for charity by training his fleas.
Mixy M. Toasus (A Muddled up, mixed up Bunny) Puppeteer - Emma deVries: Mixy is a sweet, cute carrot-loving pink rabbit, but can sometimes be neurotic, and is generally only slightly smarter than Derryn. In line with the subversive black humour of the show, Mixy is named after the myxomatosis disease, introduced to Australia to reduce the population of feral rabbits.
Keith  Puppeteer - Mal Heap: Keith is a koala, who loves eating gum leaves, sleeping, and playing his mum's old harmonica.
Kylie Puppeteer - Kelly Wallwork (Season 1), Danielle Baker (Season 2): Kylie is a kangaroo, who often has to help Keith out of trouble. She also fights frequently with Modigliana. Her later whereabouts are unclear since she doesn't appear in Feral TV.

Humans
Joe King (played by Miguel Ayesa): The Ferals' conceited, self-centered landlord who is forever trying to evict the Ferals from the shed. He is also often trying to get high-flying jobs, ranging from head of publicity at a pizza delivery place or acting as a guard at a cake factory. This attitude eventually works against him in the final episode in the series when his attempts to open a dinosaur-themed park after Derryn discovered a dinosaur bone which drove him to destroy the shed and Robbie and Leonard's flat trying to find more bones, prompting the others to destroy his house and leave him lying under the original bone. It is unclear if he was rescued from underneath the bone after the events of the show.
Leonard (played by Brian Rooney): Leonard is a science student who is always coming up with inventions, which rarely work. He has also demonstrated other skills, such as demonstrating magic tricks and hypnotizing Derryn to be smart by accident. In the finale after the destruction of his flat, he mentions that he is going to the Antarctic for a few months to gather samples as part of a science expedition.
Roberta 'Robbie' Henderson (played by Kylle Hogart): Robbie is a medical student, who loves playing the guitar, and dreams of travelling the world with a rock band. She is generally portrayed as the most tolerant of the Ferals of the three humans, often acting as their 'doctor' when they are hurt, such as when Mixy had amnesia. In the finale, she mentions that she is moving in with a new band following the destruction of her original flat.

Episodes

Feral TV
Later in 1995 a five-minute show called Feral TV was launched. The Ferals had been exploring the sewers, and had discovered the cable to a TV station. They started their own TV channel, calling it Feral TV, running under the TV boss Kerry, a loud gruff toad with an explosive temper, and his obsequious assistant the cockroach Rodney. Kerry's character is modelled on the Australian media magnate Kerry Packer, who at the time, was the owner of Channel Nine. Keith from the original show also returned for this show as well as a character from The Ferals' pilot episode called Berry the Bat. The show ran for 55 episodes.

After the Ferals
Although few of the human actors went on to achieve successful television careers, some of the puppet characters continue to feature regularly in ABC programming. Mixy, in particular, was used as a host introducing the shows on the ABC Kids programming block (Mixy), as well as having her own show and website. Rattus and Modigliana were featured in the ABC School's education maths program, Numbers Count (Mixy and Derryn were mentioned in one scene). Also Modigliana went on to feature as co-host of the show Creature Features. Derryn is the only one of the quartet not to appear in ABC's other programmes. Rattus, Modigliana and Mixy appeared in the 2022 edition of ABC New Year's Eve Early Night Show.

Mixy was an Australian program block on the ABC that hosts Mixy Rabbit from The Ferals. After the Ferals' series ended, Mixy has been used as a host for her new program block and introducing the shows in the morning.

In 2000, the puppeteer Mal Heap, who played Modigliana the cat and Keith the koala from The Ferals, introduced the role of Joe the Kangaroo alongside Mixy.

After the programming block finished in July 2002, Mixy kept appearing in ABC idents and her own website episodes until around the mid-2000s.

Hosts
 Mixy Rabbit (1998 - 2002) Puppeteer - Emma DeVries: A sweet, cute carrot-loving pink rabbit. At times gets a bit mixed up but very friendly.
 Joe the Kangaroo (2000 - 2002) Puppeteer - Mal Heap: A small brown kangaroo who loves eating broccoli. His first appearance was on the VHS tape, Mixy TV Favourites.

Toys
 Mary the Cat
 Dibadee Doll
 Scruffy the Dog

Programming
Programs in alphabetical order 
 Albert - the 5th Musketeer
 Angelina Ballerina 
 Angelmouse
 Animal Crackers
 Animal Shelf
 Archibald the Koala 
 Arthur  (now on PBS)
 Babar
 Bananas in Pyjamas
 Bear in the Big Blue House 
 Binka
 Bill and Ben
 Blinky Bill
 Bob the Builder 
 Brambly Hedge
 Brum
 Budgie the Little Helicopter
 Busy Buses
 The Busy World of Richard Scarry
 Connie the Cow 
 Cubeez 
 Enid Blyton's Enchanted Lands
 Ethelbert the Tiger
 Fireman Sam 
 The Forgotten Toys
 Franklin 
 George and Martha
 Hairy Maclary
 Hey Arnold!
 The Hoobs
 Johnson and Friends
 Kipper 
 Kitu and Woofl
 Koki
 Lil' Elvis Jones and the Truckstoppers
 Little Bear (now on Paramount+)
 Little Monsters
 Lizzie's Library
 Magic Adventures of Mumfie
 Magic Mountain
 The Magical World of Margaret Mahy
 Maisy 
 Merlin the Magical Puppy
 Miffy
 The Morph Files
 Noddy's Toyland Adventures
 Oakie Doke
 Oscar and Friends
 Oscar's Orchestra
 Pablo the Little Red Fox
 Petals
 Pingu 
 Play School
 Postman Pat 
 Preston Pig
 Rugrats
 Rupert 
 Sesame Street  (now on HBO Max and PBS Kids)
 Sheeep
 Small Stories
 Snailsbury Tales
 Spot
 Swinging
 Teletubbies (now on CBeebies)
 Thomas and Friends 
 Tiny Planets 
 What-a-Mess
 Where's Wally?
 William's Wish Wellingtons
 The Wombles
 The World of Eric Carle
 The World of Peter Rabbit and Friends

Video release
 Mixy Presents: More Favourites (1998)
 Mixy TV Favourites (2000)
 Mixy Presents TV Favourites (2002)

Website
In the early 2000s, Mixy's website was shown at the ABC Playground Website in-between shows behind painted blobs. Mousing over the green blob would display Mixy. Clicking on the character's image would present options of games, videos, fan messages and Joe the Kangaroo's corner.

Ferals Funtastic Fanbook
1996 saw the publication of The Ferals Funtastic Fanbook by Garth Frost, Wendy Gray, David Witt and Tina Matthews.

The Ferals Podcast

On 17 May 2015 the first episode of an unofficial podcast simply titled *The Ferals Podcast* was released.
On 10 January 2016 they posted their last episode.

In the podcast, hosts Monkey Boy, Swinny & Mike took an in-depth look at the cult-classic children's television show.

See also
List of Australian television series

References

External links
Official the ferals website Archived From The Wayback Machine
The Ferals at the National Film and Sound Archive

MiG (aka Miguel Ayesa)'s Official website
The Unofficial Ferals Podcast

Australian children's television series
Australian Broadcasting Corporation original programming
1994 Australian television series debuts
1995 Australian television series endings
Television series about cats
Television shows about dogs
Television series about kangaroos and wallabies
Television series about koalas
Television series about mice and rats
Television series about rabbits and hares
Television shows set in Australia
Australian television shows featuring puppetry